The 2023 Houston Dynamo season is the 18th season of the team's existence since joining Major League Soccer (MLS) prior to the 2006 season. The Dynamo missed the playoffs in 2022 for the 8th time in 9 years.

2023 is the first season under head coach Ben Olsen, who was hired on November 8, 2022.  It is the second season under GM Pat Onstad and technical director Asher Mendelsohn.  It is the third season (second full season) under majority owner Ted Segal

Current squad 

Appearances and goals are totals for MLS regular season only.

Player movement

In 
Per Major League Soccer and club policies terms of the deals do not get disclosed.

Out

Loans out

MLS SuperDraft

Staff

Friendlies

Preseason

Competitions

Major League Soccer

Standings

Western Conference

Overall

Results summary

Results by round

Match results

U.S. Open Cup 

The Dynamo will enter the competition in the Third Round.  The match will be played on either April 25 or 26.

Leagues Cup

South 2

References 

Houston Dynamo FC seasons
Houston Dynamo
Houston Dynamo
Houston Dynamo